Dugald Ronald Letham (10 September 1949 – 27 March 2008) was a Scottish actor.

Biography 
Letham was born in Falkirk, Stirlingshire. He had a sister, Maggie and attended Bantaskine then Falkirk High School. Letham originally trained as a teacher at the Jordanhill College, Glasgow before enrolling at the Royal Scottish Academy of Music and Drama before performing with the likes of the Traverse Theatre in Edinburgh, the Royal National Theatre in London, Odeon Theatre in Glasgow and the Glasgow King's Theatre. His early television appearances in shows such as Crown Court, Play for Today and The Sweeney gained Letham recognition amongst television writers and producers. However it wasn't until the 1990s that Letham became a recognised face on television, possibly for playing Rab B. Nesbitt, father of the eponymous lead character, in a 1996 episode of Rab C. Nesbitt.

He had recurring roles in television shows Atletico Partick as Gazza, Hamish Macbeth as Peter the Fireman and Ain't Misbehavin' as Snowy McGraw. He also made three separate appearances on both Taggart and The Bill playing a different character on each occasion. His final role was as Isa's estranged husband Harry in the sitcom Still Game, appearing in three episodes between 2002-06 before his character was killed off.

Death 
Letham died in Falkirk, Stirlingshire on 27 March 2008, aged 58, from complications following a fall.

References

External links 
 

1949 births
2008 deaths
Scottish male stage actors
Accidental deaths from falls
People from Falkirk
Scottish male television actors
Alumni of the Royal Conservatoire of Scotland
20th-century Scottish male actors
21st-century Scottish male actors